Dope Dogs is a 1994 album by Parliament-Funkadelic (also known as P-Funk All Stars). The album was first released on the P-Vine label in Japan. It was later released on the Hot Hands label in the United Kingdom. The United States release on the Dogone Records label, a custom label of Available Entertainment, was released under the name George Clinton and the P-Funk All-Stars. The U.S. version was remastered by David Libert of Available Entertainment.  The album's theme deals with dope-sniffing dogs that become addicted to the very drugs that they are assigned to find.

Reception

Select gave the album a rating of three out of five, stating that there are "moves and grooves aplenty, but most of it leads nowhere"

Tracks
The album's configuration varied among the Japanese, British, and American releases.

Japanese track listing
Dog Star (Fly On) (G Clinton, DeWayne McKnight) - 8:11
U.S. Custom Coast Guard Dog (G Clinton) -  4:53
Some Next Shit (G Clinton, Michael Payne) -  6:11
Follow the Leader (Rakim, G Clinton) -  5:30
Just Say Ding (Databoy) (G Clinton, Tracey Lewis, D McKnight) -  4:33
Help Scottie, Help (I'm Tweaking and I Can't Beam Up) (T Lewis, Hazel Lewis) -  5:04
Pack of Wild Dogs (G Clinton, Andre Williams, Mike E. Clark) -  5:47
Fifi (G Clinton, D McKnight) -  3:46
All Sons of Bitches (G Clinton, Belita Woods) -  5:34
Dopey Dope Dog (G Clinton, Daddy Freddy, Lige Curry) -  4:53
Sick 'Em (G Clinton) -  6:13
Kibbles and Bits (G Clinton) -  5:05
I Ain't the Lady (He Ain't the Tramp) (G Clinton, Loic Gambas Bordas, Eebony Young) -  4:38
Tales That Wag the Dog Part 1 (Niggaa, Pleeeeeze!) (G Clinton, T Lewis, Derrick Rossen) -  5:30
Tales That Wag the Dog Part 2 (Is That Your Bark or Your Bite?) (G Clinton, T Lewis, D Rossen) -

British track listing
Dog Star (Fly On) (G Clinton, D McKnight) -  8:11
Fifi (G Clinton, D McKnight) -  3:46
Some Next Shit (G Clinton, M Payne) -  6:11
Follow the Leader (Rakim, G Clinton) -  5:30
Just Say Ding (Databoy) (G Clinton, T Lewis, D McKnight) -  4:33
Help Scottie, Help (I'm Tweaking and I Can't Beam Up) (T Lewis, H Lewis) -  5:04
Lost Dog (G Clinton, Bobby Gillespie) -
U.S. Custom Coast Guard Dog  (Hyper Mix) (G Clinton) -  4:53
All Sons of Bitches (G Clinton, B Woods) -  5:34
Dopey Dope Dog (G Clinton, D Freddy, L Curry) -  4:53
Sick 'Em (G Clinton) -  6:13
Gettin' Dogged (G Clinton, Robert Johnson Jr., M Payne) -
I Ain't the Lady (He Ain't the Tramp) (G Clinton, L G Bordas, E Young) -  4:38
Tales That Wag the Dog Part 1 (Niggaa, Pleeeeeze!) (G Clinton, T Lewis, D Rossen) -  5:30
Tales That Wag the Dog Part 2 (Is That Your Bark or Your Bite?) (G Clinton, T Lewis, D Rossen) -

American track listing
Dog Star (Fly On) (G Clinton, D McKnight) -  8:11
U.S. Custom Coast Guard Dog (G Clinton) -  5:15
Some Next Shit (G Clinton, M Payne, Louis Kabbable) -  6:10
Just Say Ding (Databoy) (G Clinton, Tracey Lewis, D McKnight) -  4:33
Help Scottie, Help (I'm Tweaking and I Can't Beam Up) (T Lewis, Hazel Lewis) -  5:06
Pepe (The Pill Popper) (G Clinton) - 6:08
Back Up Against the Wall (G Clinton, D McKnight) -  5:51
Fifi (G Clinton, D McKnight) -  3:58
All Sons of Bitches (G Clinton, Belita Woods) -  4:33
Sick 'Em (G Clinton) -  5:14
I Ain't the Lady (He Ain't the Tramp) (G Clinton, L G Bordas, E Young) -  4:38
Pack of Wild Dogs (G Clinton, A Williams, Mike E. Clark) -  5:47
Tales That Wag the Dog (G Clinton, T Lewis, D Rossen) -  5:30
My Dog (G Clinton, "Crop" Holyfield) - 4:29

Personnel
Vocals: Pat Lewis, Sandra Feva, Sheila Horne, Steve Boyd, Robert "P-Nut" Johnson, Lige Curry, Belita Woods, Joe Harris, Michael "Clip" Payne, Gary "Mudbone" Cooper, Lloyd Williams, Garry Shider, Amelia Jesse, Andre Foxxe Williams, Louie "Babblin" Kabbabie, Clarence "Fuzzy" Haskins, Calvin Simon, Ray Davis, Grady Thomas, Nicole Tindall, Jeanette McGruder, Shirley Hayden, Jessica Cleaves, Janet Evans, Larry Heckstall, Duane, "Sa'D'Ali" Maultsby, Starr Cullars, Shawn Clinton, George Clinton, FROG, Patavian Lewis, Trafael, Tracey Lewis, "Cuz", Barbarella Bishop, Daddy Freddy
Guitars: Eddie Hazel, Michael Hampton, Garry Shider, DeWayne "Blackbyrd" McKnight, Andre Foxxe Williams, Cordell Mosson, Michael "Clip" Payne, Bootsy Collins, Phelps "Catfish" Collins, Jerome Ali, Jeff Bass, Loic Gambas
Bass: Lige Curry, Dewayne "Blackbyrd" McKnight, Lonnie Motley, Mike "Clip" Payne, and Bootsy Collins
Drummers and Percussionists: Frankie "Kash" Waddy, Guy Curtis, Dewayne "Blackbyrd" McKnight, Gabe Gonzales, Michael "Clip" Payne, Loic Gambas, Man In The Box, Muruga Booker
Keyboards and Piano: Joseph "Amp" Fiddler, Tracey Lewis
Organs and Synthesizers: Bernie Worrell, Michael "Clip" Payne, George Clinton, Dewayne "Blackbyrd" McKnight, Jeff Bass, and Loic Gambas
Horns: Fred Wesley, Maceo Parker, Richard Griffith, Rick Gardner, Marcus Belgrave, Bennie Cowan, Greg Thomas, Greg Boyer, Perry Robinson
Programmers and Re-mixers:  Michael "Clip" Payne, Mike E. Clark, Mike Wilder, Mark Bass, George Clinton

References

External links
 Dope Dogs at Discogs
 Dope Dogs: Japanese European version at The Motherpage

George Clinton (funk musician) albums
1994 albums
Albums with cover art by Pedro Bell